Tappeh Goleh-ye Olya (also Romanized as Tappeh Goleh-ye ‘Olyā and Tappeh Galleh-ye ‘Olyā; also known as Tappeh Galak, Tappeh Glaeh Olya, Tappeh Golā-ye Bozorg, Tappeh Gol-e ‘Olyā, Tappeh-ye Gol, and Tappeh-ye Goleh) is a village in Howmeh-ye Shomali Rural District, in the Central District of Eslamabad-e Gharb County, Kermanshah Province, Iran. At the 2006 census, its population was 281, in 58 families.

References 

Populated places in Eslamabad-e Gharb County